The women's 4 × 400 metres relay event at the 1983 Summer Universiade was held at the Commonwealth Stadium in Edmonton on 9 July 1983.

Results

References

Athletics at the 1983 Summer Universiade
1983